Xiangyang is a town of Jiancaoping District, Taiyuan, Shanxi, China. , it has one residential community and 11 villages under its administration.

References

Township-level divisions of Shanxi
Taiyuan